Lone Mountain is in the Madison Range in the U.S. state of Montana. The summit is located in Lee Metcalf Wilderness within Gallatin and Beaverhead-Deerlodge National Forests.

Recreation 

The east, north, and southern slopes of Lone Peak are occupied by Big Sky Resort.

References

Mountains of Madison County, Montana
Mountains of Montana